Sun Bo (born 22 January 1991 in Dalian, Liaoning) is a Chinese footballer who currently plays for Dalian Professional in the Chinese Super League.

Club career
Sun joined the Shandong Luneng Taishan youth team system from Dalian Shide in 2006. He was loaned to China League Two side Dalian Aerbin (now known as Dalian Professional) in 2010. He scored 5 goals in 15 appearances as Dalian Aerbin won promotion to the second tier at the end of the 2010 season. Although Shandong Luneng Taishan decided to call him back, he finally transferred to Dalian Aerbin in 2011. He played 14 league matches in the 2011 season and Dalian Aerbin won two successive championships to promote to Chinese Super League. However, Sun failed to establish himself within the team and made just 6 appearances (56 minutes in total) in 2012 season. Sun had trial at League One side Henan Jianye and Shijiazhuang Yongchang Junhao in January 2013 but stayed at Dalian Aerbin for 2013 Chinese Super League campaign. On 31 July 2013, he scored his first Super League goal 5 minutes after he substituted on in a 2–2 draw against Shanghai Dongya. He scored his second Super League goal 4 days later, which ensured Dalian Aerbin beat Wuhan Zall 3–0. On 7 August, he scored at the last moment of the match in the fifth round of 2013 Chinese FA Cup, helping Dalian Aerbin beat Jiangsu Sainty 2–1 and entered the semi-finals for the first time in club's history.

Career statistics
Statistics accurate as of match played 31 December 2021.

Honours

Club
Dalian Professional
China League One: 2011, 2017
China League Two: 2010

References

External links
 

1991 births
Living people
Association football midfielders
Chinese footballers
Footballers from Dalian
Dalian Professional F.C. players
Chinese Super League players
China League One players
China League Two players